Ella Hayward (born 8 September 2003) is an Australian cricketer who plays for the Melbourne Renegades in the Women's Big Bash League (WBBL) and Victoria in the Women's National Cricket League (WNCL). She played in eight matches for the Renegades in the 2020–21 Women's Big Bash League season. She made her Victoria debut on 18 March 2021, scoring four runs and bowling three overs for 19.

International career
In December 2022, Hayward was selected in the Australia Under-19 squad for the 2023 ICC Under-19 Women's T20 World Cup.

References

External links

Ella Hayward at Cricket Australia

2003 births
Living people
Australian women cricketers
Melbourne Renegades (WBBL) cricketers
Victoria women cricketers
Place of birth missing (living people)